Ichabod is a Biblical figure and  a Hebrew word meaning "inglorious." 

It may also refer to:


People
Ichabod Alden (1739–1778), American Revolutionary War officer
Ichabod Bartlett (1786–1853), United States Representative from New Hampshire
Ichabod Crane (colonel) (1787–1857), American military officer
Ichabod Dimock (died 1858), Nova Scotia farmer, magistrate and politician
Ichabod Goodwin (1794–1882), 27th governor of New Hampshire
Ichabod Washburn (1798–1868), American industrialist
Ichabod T. Williams (1826–1899), American businessman and art collector
Ichabod Wiswall (1637–1700), third pastor of the church in Duxbury, Plymouth Colony
Ichabod Charles Wright (1795–1871), English scholar, translator, poet and accountant
 Ichabod, a Walt Whitman pen name

Arts and entertainment
"Ichabod", a poem by John Greenleaf Whittier recounting Daniel Webster's fall from glory 
Ichabod Crane, a fictional character in Washington Irving's short story "The Legend of Sleepy Hollow"

Sports
Washburn Ichabods, the sports teams of Washburn University
The Ichabod, mascot of Washburn University, named after Ichabod Washburn

Places
Ichabod Range, a mountain range in Nevada

Jewish masculine given names